The 1890 Wimbledon Championships was a combined men's and women's tennis tournament that took place on the outdoor grass courts at the All England Lawn Tennis Club in Wimbledon, London, United Kingdom. The tournament ran from 30 June until 7 July. It was the 14th staging of the Wimbledon Championships, and the first Grand Slam tennis event of 1890. Bonham Carter Evelegh took over as referee from Julian Marshall. The rule for change-overs was altered to after every odd game. There were 30 competitors for the men's singles and only four competitors for the women's singles, the smallest entry ever for any competition at Wimbledon.  The final of the women's singles competition, which started on 2 July, was played on 5 July, while the men's singles final was played on 7 July and the men's doubles were played on 21–23 July.

Finals

Men's singles

 Willoughby Hamilton defeated  William Renshaw, 6–8, 6–2, 3–6, 6–1, 6–1

Women's singles

 Lena Rice defeated  May Jacks, 6–4, 6–1

Men's doubles

 Joshua Pim /  Frank Stoker defeated  George Hillyard /  Ernest Lewis, 6–0, 7–5, 6–4

References

External links
 Official Wimbledon Championships website

 
Wimbledon Championships
Wimbledon Championships
Wimbledon Championships
June 1890 sports events
July 1890 sports events